Trigona guianae is a species of eusocial stingless bee in the family Apidae and tribe Meliponini.

References 

guianae
Hymenoptera of South America
Hymenoptera of Brazil
Insects described in 1910